The women's 800 metres at the 1928 Summer Olympics took place between August 1 and August 2.  Some press reports of the event claimed that many of the competitors were exhausted or failed to finish the race. According to Lynne Emery, these reports were inaccurate and the athletes were winded as normal after a race. In any case, the idea that the distance was too great for women prompted the IOC to drop it from the Olympic programme. It was reintroduced in 1960.

Results

Heats

Heat 1

Key: OR = Olympic record, Q = Qualified

Heat 2

Key: Q = Qualified

Heat 3

Key: Q = Qualified

Finals

Key: WR = World record

References

Women's 800 metre
800 metres at the Olympics
1928 in women's athletics
Ath